The ridge tail salamander (Pseudoeurycea obesa), also known as ridge-tailed salamander is a species of salamander in the family Plethodontidae. It is endemic to Oaxaca, Mexico, and only known from the area of its type locality  on the mountain pass of Plan de Guadalupe in the Sierra de Mazateca, part of the Sierra Madre de Oaxaca, at 2,150 meters elevation. Future work might prove it to be more widespread than current records suggest. Its extent of occurrence is 10 km2.

Its natural habitat is cloud forest. It is only known from a total of five individuals that were found under small rocks and schist slabs in roadside talus. This might indicate tolerance to habitat modification, but habitat loss (deforestation) occurring in the area is a threat to this species.

References

Pseudoeurycea
Endemic amphibians of Mexico
Fauna of the Sierra Madre de Oaxaca
Taxonomy articles created by Polbot
Amphibians described in 2005